Mushtaq Ahmad Khan is a Pakistani politician of Jamaat e Islami Pakistan who is a Member of the Senate of Pakistan representing Khyber Pakhtunkhwa there, for the tenure of March 2018 to March 2024.

Political career
Khan's political career started when he was elected provincial head of the Islami Jamiat Talaba, a student organization, in 1997, central general secretary in 1999, and later Head of the wing for Pakistan in 2002 for being an active student leader.

Before becoming a senator, Khan was the Provincial President of Jamaat-e-Islami Khyber Pakhtunkhwa until he resigned from the party's internal post in April 2022. 

Khan was elected to the Senate of Pakistan as a candidate of Jamaat-e-Islami Pakistan on a general seat from Khyber Pakhtunkhwa in the 2018 Pakistani Senate election, backed by 7 votes of his party members in the provincial assembly of Khyber Pakhtunkhwa.  He took his oath as Senator on 12 March 2018.

In February 2021, when a video about Pakistan Tehreek-e-Insaf members taking bribes for Senate elections was leaked, a sub-committee was formed to investigate the matter. The committee consisted of Shireen Mazari, Fawad Chaudhry and Mirza Shahzad Akbar. Khan was amongst four members who were summoned to explain their position as to how they won Senate elections.

In October 2021 he was elected as President of Jamaat-e-Islami Khyber Pakhtunkhwa chapter for the third time consecutively. After his resignation as Provincial President of the Party in April 2022 due to his increased involvement in the Senate of Pakistan, he was succeeded by Muhammad Ibrahim Khan.

During his tenure as senator, he has been a member of at least 6 sub-committees of the houses including: "Devolution (Chairperson Committee)", "Select Committee on The Islamabad Capital Territory Trust (Amendment) Bill,2020", "Cabinet Secretariat", "House Business Advisory Committee", "Defence", "Inter-Provicial Coordination", "Federal Education and Professional Training", and "Parliamentary Committee to Protect Minorities from Forced Conversions".

In February 2022 he was declared amongst the top 5 senators that spoke on the floor of the senate..

Political Actions

Missing Children & Persons 
In December 2018, as part of the Senate’s special committee against child abuse, Khan said around 25 million children weren’t even attending school but the government kept boasting of good performance. He claimed that children were being smuggled across the border with Iran.

Corruption Cases 
In August 2020, Khan as chairperson of The Senate Standing Committee on Science and Technology, took up various issues of importance including irregularities & corruption cases at Pakistan Council of Scientific and Industrial Research (PCSIR) & Pakistan Standards and Quality Control Authority (PSQCA).

Efforts on national reconciliation 
In June 2022, Khan claimed that despite being a member of the Parliamentary Committee on the National Security (PCNS), he was being ignored from being invited to the meetings of the committee and demanded that the details of negotiations with dissenting factions of society be made public.

Calls to bring back Aafia Siddiqui 
Khan has been raising the matter to the government of Pakistan on the floor of the parliament to the PTI government as well as the PDM government, however both governments failed to provide satisfactory answers regarding the efforts done to recover Aafia.

References

Living people
Members of the Senate of Pakistan
Year of birth missing (living people)
Khyber Pakhtunkhwa politicians
People from Swabi District
Jamaat-e-Islami Pakistan politicians
Government Post Graduate College, Swabi alumni